Tyson John Lawrence, OAM (born 9 June 1978)  is an Australian Paralympic tandem cycling pilot, who worked with Kieran Modra at the 2008 Beijing Games.  At the games, he won a gold medal in the Men's Individual Pursuit B VI 1-3 event, for which he received a Medal of the Order of Australia, and a bronze medal in the Men's 1 km Time Trial B VI 1-3 event.

References

1978 births
Paralympic cyclists of Australia
Cyclists at the 2008 Summer Paralympics
Paralympic gold medalists for Australia
Paralympic bronze medalists for Australia
Paralympic sighted guides
Recipients of the Medal of the Order of Australia
Living people
Medalists at the 2008 Summer Paralympics
Australian male cyclists
Paralympic medalists in cycling